Inga saffordiana is a species of plant in the family Fabaceae. It is found in Colombia and Panama. It is threatened by habitat loss.

References

saffordiana
Flora of Colombia
Flora of Panama
Vulnerable plants
Taxonomy articles created by Polbot